The Fowler Ridge Wind Farm is a wind farm in Benton County, Indiana, near the city of Fowler, IN about  northwest of Lafayette and  northwest of Indianapolis. Fowler Ridge was originally developed in 2005 and 2006 by Orion Energy, LLC (Oakland, CA) and Vision Energy, LLC (Cincinnati, OH) and later sold in 2007 to BP and Dominion Resources. The project was constructed beginning in 2008 in two phases and has a nameplate capacity of 600 MW.

Fowler Ridge was the second utility-scale wind power plant in Indiana, after the 130.5 MW Goodland I Wind Farm (also in Benton County and was also developed by Orion Energy, LLC (Oakland, CA) and Vision Energy, LLC (Cincinnati, OH)). The Benton County Wind Farm came online in 2008. Some of the wind turbines are visible from US 52, the main highway through the County. They are also visible along US 41 in the Boswell area. Other wind farms developed by Orion and Vision include the Camp Grove Wind Farm and the Benton County Wind Farm.

Phase one 

The first phase of the project is online and consists of 222 wind turbines, 182 Vestas V82-1.65 MW turbines and 40 Clipper C-96 2.5 MW turbines, with a nameplate capacity of 400 MW.

Phase two 

Phase two consists of 133 GE 1.5 MW wind turbines with a total nameplate capacity of 200 MW. Construction began in early 2009 and phase two became operational in early 2010.

Electricity production

See also

Wind power in Indiana
Benton County Wind Farm - Benton County, Indiana
Meadow Lake Wind Farm - White, Jasper, and Benton Counties

References

External links

 Map  from Fish & Wildlife Service permit

Buildings and structures in Benton County, Indiana
Energy infrastructure completed in 2008
Energy infrastructure completed in 2010
Wind farms in Indiana
American Electric Power
BP